These are the number-one singles of 1978 according to the Top 100 Singles in Cash Box Magazine

References
 http://www.cashboxmagazine.com/archives/70s_files/1978.html
 https://web.archive.org/web/20060614052031/http://musicseek.info/no1hits/1978.htm

See also

 1978 in music
 List of number-one hits (USA)
 Hot 100 number-one hits of 1978 (USA) by Billboard magazine
 RPM number-one hits of 1978 for the #1 hits in Canada

1978
1978 record charts
1978 in American music